Tom Pelsmaekers (born 26 January 1993) is a Belgian sailor. He and Yannick Lefèbvre placed 17th in the 49er event at the 2016 Summer Olympics.

References

1993 births
Living people
Belgian male sailors (sport)
Olympic sailors of Belgium
Sailors at the 2016 Summer Olympics – 49er